The 2020 Star Nursery 150 was the first stock car race of the 2020 ARCA Menards Series West season and the third iteration of the event. The race was held on Thursday, February 20, 2020, in North Las Vegas, Nevada, at the Las Vegas Motor Speedway Bullring, a  low-banked permanent racetrack. The race took the scheduled 150 laps to complete. At race's end, Sam Mayer of GMS Racing would dominate the race to win his first and to date, final career ARCA Menards Series West win and his first and only win of the season. To fill out the podium, Jesse Love of Bill McAnally Racing and Blaine Perkins of Sunrise Ford Racing would finish second and third, respectively.

Background 
Las Vegas Motor Speedway, located in Clark County, Nevada outside the Las Vegas city limits and about 15 miles northeast of the Las Vegas Strip, is a 1,200-acre (490 ha) complex of multiple tracks for motorsports racing. The complex is owned by Speedway Motorsports, Inc., which is headquartered in Charlotte, North Carolina.

Entry list 

*Withdrew.

Practice

First practice 
The first practice session was held on Thursday, February 20, and would last for 45 minutes.

Second practice 
The second and final practice session, sometimes referred to as Happy Hour, was held on Thursday, February 20, and would last for 45 minutes.

Qualifying 
Qualifying was held on Thursday, February 20, at 5:00 PM PST. Each driver would have two laps to set a fastest time; the fastest of the two would count as their official qualifying lap.

Full qualifying results

Race results

References 

2020 ARCA Menards Series West
NASCAR races at Las Vegas Motor Speedway
February 2020 sports events in the United States
2020 in sports in Nevada